The 2020–21 season was Northampton Town's 123rd season of existence and their first season back in League One after winning the play–offs the previous season. Along with competing in League One, the club also participated in the FA Cup, EFL Cup and the EFL Trophy.

Players

Pre-season
The Cobblers announced pre-season friendlies against Leyton Orient and  Luton Town

Competitions

League One

League table

Results summary

League position by match

Matches

The 2020–21 season fixtures were released on 21 August.

FA Cup

The draw for the first round was made on Monday 26, October.

Carabao Cup

The first round draw was made on 18 August. The draw for both the second and third round were confirmed on September 6, live on Sky Sports by Phil Babb.

Leasing.com Trophy

The regional group stage draw was confirmed on 18 August. The second round draw was made by Matt Murray on 20 November, at St Andrew’s. The third round was made on 10 December 2020 by Jon Parkin.

Appearances, goals and cards

Transfers

Transfers in

Loans in

Loans out

Transfers out

References

Northampton Town
Northampton Town F.C. seasons